Denis Vavro (born 10 April 1996) is a Slovak professional footballer who plays as a centre-back for Copenhagen of the Danish Superliga and the Slovakia national team.

Club career

Žilina
Vavro made his debut for MŠK Žilina against AS Trenčín on 20 April 2013.

Copenhagen
On 26 August 2017, Denis Vavro signed a five-year contract with Danish Superliga champions Copenhagen.

Lazio
On 4 July 2019, Vavro moved to Serie A team S.S. Lazio for a reported transfer fee of €10 million.

Loan to Huesca 
On 1 February 2021, Vavro moved to La Liga club Huesca, on a loan deal until the end of the season.

Return to Copenhagen
On 24 January 2022, he returned to Copenhagen on loan with an option to buy. On 6 July 2022, it was announced that Copenhagen had triggered the option clause and Vavro re-signed with the Danish team on a 4-year deal. His spell at Lazio was described as unimpressive and Vavro appreciated the return to Denmark as a return home.

Days before he confirmed his stay at Parken Stadium, a video surfaced on social media in which Vavro was asked if he hated Lazio, to which he quickly responded positively. He soon apologised on social media, stating that the club was "big and historic" and even "too big for a player like me".

International career
Vavro was called up for two unofficial friendly fixtures held in Abu Dhabi, UAE, in January 2017, against Uganda and Sweden. He capped his debut against Uganda, playing the entire match. In 57th minute, Vavro scored his first goal, by shooting from outside of the penalty box after a deflected corner. Slovakia went on to lose the game 1–3. He also played an entire match against Sweden (0–6 loss) on 12 January.

Career statistics

Club

Scores and results list Slovakia's goal tally first, score column indicates score after each Vavro goal.

Honours
MŠK Žilina
Slovak Super Liga: 2016–17

Copenhagen
Danish Superliga: 2018–19
 The Atlantic Cup: runner-up 2022

Individual
Peter Dubovský Award: 2017

References

External links
 MŠK Žilina profile 
 Corgoň Liga profile 
 
 Eurofotbal profile 
 
 

1996 births
Living people
People from Partizánske
Sportspeople from the Trenčín Region
Slovak footballers
Association football defenders
Slovakia international footballers
Slovakia under-21 international footballers
Slovakia youth international footballers
MŠK Žilina players
F.C. Copenhagen players
S.S. Lazio players
SD Huesca footballers
Slovak Super Liga players
Danish Superliga players
Serie A players
La Liga players
UEFA Euro 2020 players
Slovak expatriate footballers
Slovak expatriate sportspeople in Denmark
Slovak expatriate sportspeople in Italy
Slovak expatriate sportspeople in Spain
Expatriate men's footballers in Denmark
Expatriate footballers in Italy
Expatriate footballers in Spain